ISWA may refer to:
 Islamic State – West Africa Province
 International Solid Waste Association
 International School of Western Australia
 International Sign Writing Alphabet